Raquette Lake is a hamlet in the town of Long Lake in Hamilton County, New York, United States.

The community is on New York State Route 28 on the western side of Raquette Lake. Great Camp Sagamore is in the hamlet.

References

External links 
 
 

Hamlets in New York (state)
Hamlets in Hamilton County, New York